Screams in the Night may refer to: 
The Awful Dr. Orloff or Screams in the Night, a 1962 film directed by Jesús Franco
 The Unnaturals or Screams in the Night, a 1969 film directed by Antonio Margheriti
 Screams in the Night, the 1987 debut album by Hellion

See also 
 A Scream in the Night, a 1934 film directed by Fred C. Newmeyer